Maria Beatty is a Venezuelan filmmaker who directs, acts, and produces. Her films are often made in black and white and cover various aspects of female sexuality, including BDSM and fetishism. She was inspired by expressionist German cinema, French surrealism, and American film noir.

She sometimes stars in her own films, such as The Elegant Spanking (1995) and The Black Glove (1997). In 2007, she won the FICEB Tacón De Aguja Best Director Award for Silken Sleeves.

Annie Sprinkle’s 1992 production The Sluts and Goddesses Video Workshop – Or How To Be A Sex Goddess in 101 Easy Steps was co-produced and co-directed with Beatty. It featured music by composer Pauline Oliveros.

Selected filmography

Spit and Ashes (2019)
The Black Widow (2015)
The Medicine Man (2013)
The Return of Post Apocalyptic Cowgirls (2010)
Bandaged (2009)
Post Apocalyptic Cowgirls (2009)
The Strap-On Motel (2008)
White Bonnet (2008)
Belle de Nature (2008)
Sex Mannequin (2007)
Boy in a Bathtub (2007)
Coma (2007)
Mask of Innocence (2006)
Silken Sleeves (2006)
Ecstasy in Berlin, 1926  (2004)
Tight Security (2003)
Seven Deadly Sins (2002)
Waterworld (2002)
Tina's Toytrunk (2001)
Ladies of the Night (2000)
Sassy Schoolgirl Pt. 2 (2000)
Leda and the Swan (1999)
Testify My Love (1999)
Doctor's Orders (1998)
Sassy Schoolgirl Pt. 1 (1998)
Converted to Tickling (1998)
The Boiler Room (1998)
Let the Punishment fit the Child (1997)
The Dueling Pages (1997)
The Black Glove (1997)
The Elegant Spanking (1995)
A Lot of Fun for the Evil One (1993)
Imaging Her Erotics (1992)
Sphinxes Without Secrets (1991)
Gang of Souls: A Generation of Beat Poets (1989)

See also
 List of female film and television directors
 List of LGBT-related films directed by women

References

External links
 Bleu Productions
 Bleu Productions Member's Website
 Bandaged the film
 IMDb entry for Maria Beatty (I)
 "Masochism, or The Cruel Mother in Maria Beatty's Pornography" by Katrien Jacobs, Critical Studies 17:13–34, 1997.
 "Dungeons and Doms" by Tristan Taormino, Village Voice, January 29, 2002.
 Interview with Maria Beatty and other directors at the Amsterdam Alternative Erotic Film Festival, 2009, Mailfemale.tv.

American film actresses
Venezuelan emigrants to the United States
Women pornographic film directors
Fetish subculture
BDSM people
Year of birth missing (living people)
Living people
21st-century American women